Salomon Glacier is a glacier flowing south into Hamilton Bay, at the east end of South Georgia. Named by the German Antarctic Expedition under Wilhelm Filchner, 1911–12.

See also
 List of glaciers in the Antarctic
 Glaciology

References

Glaciers of South Georgia